Guankou Subdistrict is an urban subdistrict and the seat of Liuyang City, Hunan Province, China. Xijiang Township merged to Guankou subdistrict on November 18, 2015. The town is bordered to the northeast by Gugang Town, to the southeast by Gaoping Town, to the south by Hehua Subdistrict, to the west by Jiaoxi Township, to the northwest by Chunkou Town, and to the southwest by Jili Subdistrict.

History
In 2015, Xijiang Township merged to Guankou subdistrict.

Administrative division
The subdistrict is divided into nine villages and three communities, the following areas: 
 Shuijia Community
 Zhanjia Community
 Changxing Community
 Jinkou Village
 Yangxihu Village
 Shengping Village
 Jinqiao Village
 JinhuVillage
 Hetian Village
 Tanpeng Village
 Xijiang Village
 Daoyuanhu Village

Geography
The subdistrict has two reservoirs: Quantang Reservoir and Daoyuan Reservoir.

Liuyang River, also known as the mother river, flows through the subdistrict.

Economy
The economy is supported primarily by commerce and aquatic products industry.

Education
 Tianjibing Experimental Middle School

Transportation
The East Bus station is situated at the subdistrict.

Expressway
The Changsha–Liuyang Expressway, from Changsha, running west to east through the subdistrict to Jiangxi.

Provincial Highway
The Provincial Highway S309 runs south–north through the subdistrict.

Railway
The Liling–Liuyang railway, passes across the subdistrict north to south.

Attractions
Two public parks are located in the subdistrict: Changtang Park and Sports Park.

References

Divisions of Liuyang
Liuyang
County seats in Hunan